Aurat, also known by its English title Woman, is a 1940 Indian film directed by Mehboob Khan and starring Sardar Akhtar, Surendra, Yakub, Kanhaiyalal and Arun Kumar Ahuja. The film's music is by Anil Biswas and dialogue is by Wajahat Mirza. Mehboob Khan later remade this film as Mother India (1957), which is considered one of the biggest hits of all time in Indian Cinema (and again repeated Wajahat Mirza for  dialogues, Kanhiyalal as Sukhi Lala and Faredoon Irani for cinematography).

Plot
Radha (Sardar Akhtar) is an indomitable woman, toiling away to feed her three sons and to pay off Sukhilala (Kanhaiyalal), the village's rapacious moneylender. When she learns that she is pregnant again, her husband, Shamu (Arun Kumar Ahuja), runs far away, leaving her to fend for herself against poverty and the lecherous advances of Sukhilala. Later, the two eldest children die, leaving her with only two sons: the strait-laced Ramu (Surendra) and the wild Birju (Yakub). The latter of the two becomes a bandit, who kills Sukhilala and kidnaps his childhood sweetheart. As a result, Radha and Ramu are cast out of the village. Eventually, Radha kills Birju for dishonoring her.

Cast

 Surendra as Ramu
 Sardar Akhtar as Radha
 Yakub as Briju
 Aroon as Shamu
 Harish as Bansi
 Jyoti	as Jamna
 Kanhaiyalal as Sukhi
 Vatsala Kumtekar as Kamla
 Sunalini as Sunder Chachi
 Brijrani as Tulsi
 Akbar Gulam Ali as Laloo
 Kanu Pande as Chandoo
 Wasker as Fulchand
 Amirbanu as Kashibai

References

External links 
 
 
 Full movie on YouTube

1940 films
Indian black-and-white films
1940s Hindi-language films
Films scored by Anil Biswas
Films directed by Mehboob Khan
Films about women in India
Filicide in fiction
Articles containing video clips
1940s Urdu-language films
Indian drama films
1940 drama films
Hindi-language drama films
Urdu-language Indian films